Sir Allen Bristol Aylesworth,  (27 November 1854 – 13 February 1952) was a Canadian lawyer and parliamentarian.

Life and career
Born in Newburgh, Canada West, of United Empire Loyalist ancestry, Aylesworth was educated at the University of Toronto, and called to the Ontario Bar in 1878. As the Canadian member of the Alaska Boundary Tribunal in 1903, he presented his country's views in a minority report. Elected to the Dominion parliament in 1905, he served in the cabinet of Sir Wilfrid Laurier as postmaster-general and minister of labour, 1905–1906, and minister of justice, 1906–1911, in which capacity he oversaw the pardon of Angelina Napolitano, Canada's first battered woman defence case. He acted as British representative at the North Atlantic Fisheries Arbitration in The Hague, 1910–1911, and was knighted for his services.

A Liberal, Aylesworth was elected to the House of Commons of Canada in a by-election on 22 November 1905 and re-elected in the 1908 as the Member of Parliament for the riding of York North in the province of Ontario. He served Cabinet of Canada under Sir Wilfrid Laurier as the Minister of Labour and Postmaster General of Canada from 16 October 1905 – 3 June 1906, and as the Minister of Justice and Attorney General of Canada from 4 June 1906 – 6 October 1911.  On 11 January 1923 he was appointed to the Senate of Canada upon the recommendation of William Lyon Mackenzie King. He represented the senatorial division of North York, Ontario until his death.

Legacy
Mount Aylesworth, aka Boundary Peak 177, a summit on the Alaska-British Columbia boundary, was named for him in 1927.

References

External links 

Plaque in Honour of Sir Allen Bristol Aylesworth (plaque #26)
Allen Bristol Aylesworth archives held at the University of Toronto Archives and Records Management Services

1854 births
1952 deaths
Canadian Knights Commander of the Order of St Michael and St George
Canadian King's Counsel
Canadian senators from Ontario
Liberal Party of Canada MPs
Liberal Party of Canada senators
Members of the House of Commons of Canada from Ontario
Members of the King's Privy Council for Canada
Postmasters General of Canada
Lawyers in Ontario
University of Toronto alumni
Ministers of Labour of Canada